Oil Pollution Act of 1924 is a United States federal statute establishing regulations for coastal navigable waters with regards to intentional fossil fuel discharges from seagoing vessels. The Act of Congress grants the Secretary of War authority to evaluate the oil volume discharge from a vessel while assessing if coastal navigable waters have a potential toxicity posing a deleterious condition for human health and seafood contamination. The 1924 United States statute provides judicial penalties encompassing civil and criminal punishment for violations of the prescribed regulations as stated in the Act.

The legislation was passed by the 68th United States Congressional session and confirmed as a federal law by the 29th President of the United States Warren G. Harding on June 7, 1924.

Provisions of the Act
The 1924 environmental law provided seven codified sections defining territorial jurisdiction for the United States inland navigable waters.

33 U.S.C. § 431 ~ Title of Act
33 U.S.C. § 432 ~ Meaning of terms
33 U.S.C. § 433 ~ Unlawful discharge of oil in navigable waters
33 U.S.C. § 434 ~ Punishment for violation of oil discharge and liability of vessel
33 U.S.C. § 435 ~ Revocation of officers licenses for violations 
33 U.S.C. § 436 ~ Administration by harbor and river officers for arrest of offenders and enforcement
33 U.S.C. § 437 ~ Act is an addition and not a repeal of existing navigable water laws

Amendment and Repeal of 1924 Act
The Clean Water Restoration Act of 1966 amended the 1924 public law requiring vessel ownerships to recover oil discharges in relationship to the adjoining shorelines and navigable waters of the United States. The 1966 amendment designated the authority of the Act to the U.S. Department of the Interior with a provision allowing enforcement activities by the United States Armed Forces. The federal statute was passed by the United States 89th Congressional session and enacted into law by the 36th President of the United States Lyndon Johnson on November 3, 1966.

The Oil Pollution Act of 1924 was repealed by the United States 91st Congressional session enactment of the Federal Water Pollution Control Act Amendments of 1970. The United States statute was confirmed as a federal law by the 37th President of the United States Richard Nixon on April 3, 1970.

See also
 Inland waterways of the United States
 Intracoastal Waterway
 Oil discharge monitoring equipment
 Oil Pollution Act of 1961
 Oil Pollution Act of 1973
 Oil Pollution Act of 1990
 Refuse Act of 1899
 Rivers and Harbors Act

References

External links
 
 

1924 in American law
1924 in the environment
68th United States Congress
Ocean pollution
United States federal environmental legislation
1924 in the United States
Water pollution in the United States